The Screen Award for Best Actress is one of the Screen Awards of merit presented annually by a distinguished panel of judges from the Indian "Bollywood" film industry, to recognise an actress who has delivered an outstanding performance in a leading role.

Superlatives

Multiple winners
 5 Wins : Vidya Balan
 3 Wins : Madhuri Dixit, Alia Bhatt
 2 Wins : Kajol, Aishwarya Rai, Rani Mukerji, Kareena Kapoor, Priyanka Chopra and Deepika Padukone

Multiple nominees
 9 Nominations : Kajol, Aishwarya Rai                         
 8 Nominations : Rani Mukerji, Priyanka Chopra
 7 Nominations : Tabu, Deepika Padukone, Vidya Balan
 6 Nominations : Alia Bhatt
 5 Nominations : Madhuri Dixit, Karisma Kapoor, Preity Zinta, Kareena Kapoor, Kangana Ranaut

Winners and nominees

† - Indicates the performance also "Won" the Filmfare Award for Best Actress.
‡ - Indicates the performance was also "Nominated" for the Filmfare Award for Best Actress.

1990s

2000s

2010s

2020s

References

See also
 Screen Awards
 Bollywood
 Cinema of India

Screen Awards
Film awards for lead actress